Grigor Dimitrov was the defending champion, but lost to Tomáš Berdych in the final, 5–7, 6–4, 6–4.

Seeds
The top four seeds received a bye into the second round.

 Tomáš Berdych (champion)
 Grigor Dimitrov (final)
 Kevin Anderson (second round)
 Alexandr Dolgopolov (second round)
 Leonardo Mayer (second round)
 Jérémy Chardy (second round)
 Fernando Verdasco (quarterfinals)
 João Sousa (first round)

Draw

Finals

Top half

Bottom half

Qualifying

Seeds

 Dustin Brown (qualified)
 Pierre-Hugues Herbert (qualified)
 James Duckworth (first round)
 Vincent Millot (first round)
 Austin Krajicek (second round)
 Marius Copil (qualified)
 Andrea Arnaboldi (qualifying competition)
 Yann Marti (first round)

Qualifiers

Qualifying draw

First qualifier

Second qualifier

Third qualifier

Fourth qualifier

References
 Main Draw
 Qualifying Draw

If Stockholm Open - Singles
2014 Stockholm Open